The 1907 Franklin & Marshall football team was an American football team that represented Franklin & Marshall College during the 1907 college football season. The team compiled a 4–6 record.  Vere Triechler was the team's head coach.

Schedule

References

Franklin and Marshall
Franklin & Marshall Diplomats football seasons
Franklin and Marshall football